Rafał Augustyn (born 14 May 1984, in Dębica near Mielec) is a Polish race walker.

Achievements

Personal bests
Outdoor
 3000 m walk – 11:17.82 (Sosnowiec 2011)
 5000 m walk – 19:26.55 (Kraków 2011)
 10,000 m walk – 40:37.73 (Warsaw 2006)
 10 km walk – 39:47 (Kraków 2010)
 20 km walk – 1:20:53 (Zaniemyśl 2012)
 50 km walk – 3:43:55 (Dudince 2015)
Indoor
 5000 m walk – 19:16.51 (Sopot 2014)

References
 

1984 births
Living people
Polish male racewalkers
Athletes (track and field) at the 2008 Summer Olympics
Athletes (track and field) at the 2012 Summer Olympics
Athletes (track and field) at the 2016 Summer Olympics
Olympic athletes of Poland
People from Dębica
Sportspeople from Podkarpackie Voivodeship
World Athletics Championships athletes for Poland
Athletes (track and field) at the 2020 Summer Olympics